The Valley of Narcissi is a nature reserve in , Zakarpattia Oblast, Ukraine.

References

External links

Protected areas of Ukraine
Nature reserves in Ukraine